There are three songs with that name:

by Gabriella Cilmi, see The Sting (Gabriella Cilmi album)
by Lexy & K-Paul
by New Found Glory, featuring Hayley Williams, see Resurrection (New Found Glory album)